4D with Demi Lovato is a podcast hosted by American singer Demi Lovato. Its first episode was released on May 19, 2021; new episodes are released weekly each Wednesday, along with the accompanying video versions on Lovato's YouTube channel. In each episode, Lovato interviews special guests focusing on topics including mental health, LGBTQIA+ rights, equity and justice, body positivity, art, environment, and activism.

In its first episode, Lovato publicly came out as non-binary and announced her decision to change her gender pronouns to they/them, before talking about gender identity and non-binary community with author and performer Alok Vaid-Menon.

Background
On March 30, 2021, Lovato announced via Twitter that she would release a podcast in partnership with Cadence13, OBB Media, and SB Projects. The podcast trailer was released on May 12, 2021, stating she would "share what's on her heart".

Episodes
Episodes are released weekly, on Wednesdays. , the podcast has aired 23 episodes.

References

External links

2021 podcast debuts
Audio podcasts
Video podcasts
Interview podcasts
American podcasts
LGBT-related podcasts